HMS Conqueror was a 74-gun third rate ship of the line of the Royal Navy, built by Israel Pownoll and launched on 10 October 1773 at Plymouth.

May, 1778 under command of Capt. Thomas Graves.

She was commanded by Captain George Balfour in the Battle of the Saintes, 1782. Here she was fifth in line in the attack on the French fleet.

She was broken up in 1794.

Citations and notes

References

Lavery, Brian (2003) The Ship of the Line - Volume 1: The development of the battlefleet 1650-1850. Conway Maritime Press. .
Winfield, Rif (2007) British Warships of the Age of Sail 1714-1792: Design, Construction, Careers and Fates. Seaforth. .

Ships of the line of the Royal Navy
Royal Oak-class ships of the line
1773 ships